The Yontala is a river in Kichmengsko-Gorodetsky District, Vologda Oblast, Russia. It is a right tributary of the Yug.

References

Rivers of Vologda Oblast